"Get Throwed" is the third single from Bun B's debut album Trill. It features Pimp C, Z-Ro, Young Jeezy, and Jay-Z.

The song was the first video Pimp C was featured on since he was released from his prison sentence. In the music video, Jay-Z is absent because of contract restrictions, so Bun B and Pimp C took his place. This is the first time Young Jeezy worked with Pimp C and this is Jay-Z's second time working with UGK, since they worked on "Big Pimpin'".

Canadian rapper Drake sampled this song on his song titled, N 2 Deep, on his sixth studio album Certified Lover Boy.

Charts

References

Further reading

2006 singles
Bun B songs
Jay-Z songs
Pimp C songs
Z-Ro songs
Jeezy songs
Songs written by Jay-Z
2005 songs
Songs written by Jeezy
Songs written by Pimp C
Songs written by Bun B